Engineering schools provide engineering education at the higher education level includes both undergraduate and graduate levels.  Schools which provide such education are typically part of a university, institute of technology, or polytechnic institute.  Such scholastic divisions for engineering are generally referred to by several different names, the most common being College of Engineering or School of Engineering, and typically consist of several departments, each of which has its own faculty and teaches a certain branch of engineering.  Students frequently specialize in specific branches of engineering, such as mechanical engineering, electrical engineering, chemical engineering, or civil engineering, among others.

Bangladesh

Belgium

Canada  
Engineering Schools in Canada are accredited by the Canadian Engineering Accreditation Board and their provincial professional association partners.

France
 Grandes écoles d'ingénieurs

India 
 Indian Institutes of Technology - 23 institutes
 National Institutes of Technology - 31 institutes
 Indian Institutes of Information Technology - 25 institutes

Italy 
 Polytechnic University of Milan
 Polytechnic University of Turin
 Sapienza University of Rome
 Second University of Naples
 University of Bologna
 University of Catania
 University of Naples Federico II
 University of Padua
 University of Palermo
 University of Pisa
 University of Salento

Kenya
University of Nairobi- College of Architecture and Engineering
Jomo Kenyatta University of Agriculture and Technology (JKUAT) - College of Engineering and Technology (COETEC)

Malaysia

Morocco

Philippines

Russia
 Moscow Aviation Institute (National Research University)
 Bauman Moscow State Technical University
 Far Eastern Federal University - Engineering School
 Irkutsk State Technical University
 Military Engineering-Technical University
 MISA National University of Science and Technology or MISiS, Moscow Institute of Steel and Alloys
 Moscow Institute of Physics and Technology
 Moscow Power Engineering Institute
 Moscow State Institute of Radio Engineering, Electronics and Automation
 Nizhny Novgorod State Technical University
 Novosibirsk State Technical University
 Omsk State Technical University
 Pskov State Polytechnic Institute
 Saint Petersburg Academic University
 Saint Petersburg State Institute of Technology
 Saint Petersburg State Polytechnical University
 Saint Petersburg State University of Aerospace Instrumentation
 Saint Petersburg State University of Engineering and Economics
 Saint Petersburg State University of Information Technologies, Mechanics and Optics
 South Ural State University
 Southern Federal University
 Tomsk Polytechnic University
 Ural Federal University

South Korea
 Seoul National University College of Engineering
 Hanyang University College of Engineering
 KAIST
 Pohang University of Science and Technology (POSTECH)

Sri Lanka

Thailand
 Bangkok University
 Chulalongkorn University
 Kasetsart University
 King Mongkut's University of Technology Thonburi
 King Mongkut's University of Technology North Bangkok
 Khon Kaen University
 King Mongkut's Institute of Technology Ladkrabang
 Prince of Songkla University
 Chiang Mai University
 Rajamangala University of Technology Thanyaburi
 Thammasat University
 Mahidol University
 Burapha University
 Silpakorn University
 Srinakharinwirot University
 Suranaree University of Technology

United States

The following is a list of schools with ABET-accredited bachelor's degrees programs in engineering:

Uzbekistan
Turin Polytechnic University in Tashkent
Tashkent State Technical University
Tashkent Institute of Irrigation and Melioration
Tashkent Automobile and Road Construction Institute

References